Mati Nuude (18 February 1941 – 10 March 2001) was an Estonian weightlifter and singer.

Nuude was born in Tallinn to a family of an Estonian officer, Lieutenant Albert Nuude, who was arrested by the NKVD and died in a Soviet prison camp. In 1949 Nuude, his mother, grandmother and brother were deported to Northern Kazakhstan. They were allowed to return to Estonia in 1958. His uncle was actor Rudolf Nuude.

His coach in weightlifting was Alfred Neuland. During 1965–1975 he was 7 times champion of Estonia in weightlifting and at his peak he was the eighth strongest man in the world.

During 1975–1989 he was a singer in the band Apelsin. Later he was a solo singer.

Mati Nuude died in Tallinn and is interred in the Metsakalmistu cemetery, Tallinn.

References

External links
 
 

1941 births
2001 deaths
Estonian male weightlifters
Sportspeople from Tallinn
Singers from Tallinn
20th-century Estonian male singers
Burials at Metsakalmistu
Estonian expatriates in Russia